The 1936 United States presidential election in Alabama took place on November 3, 1936, as part of the nationwide presidential election. Voters chose eleven representatives, or electors to the Electoral College, who voted for president and vice president. In Alabama, voters voted for electors individually instead of as a slate, as in the other states.

Alabama voted for the Democratic candidate Franklin D. Roosevelt over Republican candidate Alf Landon. Roosevelt won Alabama by a margin of 73.56%.

Results

Results by county

See also
United States presidential elections in Alabama

References

Alabama
1936
1936 Alabama elections